SS Columbia (1902) may refer to:

 SS Columbia (1902 ocean liner), an ocean liner built for the Anchor Line as a passenger and cargo liner
 SS Columbia (1902 steamboat), the last remaining excursion steamboat from the turn of the 20th century still in existence

See also 
 List of ships named SS Columbia